The following is a list of awards and nominations received by Welsh actor and director Anthony Hopkins.

He is an Oscar-winning actor, having received six Academy award nominations winning two of these for Best Actor for his performance as Hannibal Lecter in the Jonathan Demme thriller The Silence of the Lambs (1991) and for his performance as Anthony in Florian Zeller's drama The Father (2020). He also was nominated for his performances as in James Ivory's The Remains of the Day (1993), Richard Nixon in Oliver Stone's drama Nixon (1995), John Quincy Adams in Amistad (1997), and Pope Benedict XVI in the Fernando Meirelles drama The Two Popes (2019).

For his work on film and television, he has received eight Golden Globe award nominations. In 2006 he was honored with the Cecil B. DeMille award for his lifetime achievement in the entertainment industry. He has received six Primetime Emmy award nominations winning two—one in 1976 for his performance as Richard Hauptmann in The Lindbergh Kidnapping Case and the other in 1981 for his performance as Adolf Hitler in The Bunker, as well as seven Screen Actors Guild award nominations all of which have been respectively lost.

Major associations

Academy Awards 
2 wins out of 6 nominations

BAFTA Awards 
4 wins (and one honorary award) out of 9 nominations

Emmy Awards 
2 wins out of 6 nominations

Golden Globe Awards 
0 wins (and one honorary award) out of 8 nominations

Olivier Awards 
1 win out of 2 nominations

Screen Actors Guild Awards 
0 wins out of 7 nominations

Audience awards

MTV Movie + TV awards 
0 wins out of 2 nominations

People's Choice awards 
0 wins out of 1 nomination

Critic and association awards

Alliance of Women Film Journalists awards 
1 win out of 2 nominations

Boston Society of Film Critics awards 
2 win out of 2 nomination

CableACE awards 
1 win out of 2 nominations

Chicago Film Critics Association awards 
1 win out of 5 nominations

Critics' Choice awards 
1 win out of 4 nominations

Dallas-Fort Worth Film Critics Association awards 
2 wins out of 2 nominations

Kansas City Film Critics Circle awards 
2 wins out of 2 nominations

London Critics Circle Film awards 
1 win out of 5 nominations

Los Angeles Film Critics Association awards 
1 win out of 2 nominations

National Board of Review awards 
2 wins out of 2 nominations

National Society of Film Critics awards 
0 wins out of 1 nomination

New York Film Critics Circle awards 
1 win out of 3 nominations

Online Film & Television Association awards 
1 win out of 3 nominations

Online Film Critics Society awards 
0 wins out of 1 nomination

Phoenix Film Critics Society awards 
0 wins out of 1 nomination

Southeastern Film Critics Association awards 
1 win out of 2 nominations

St. Louis Film Critics Association awards 
1 win out of 2 nomination

Women's Image Network awards 
0 wins out of 1 nomination

Film festival awards

Hollywood Film Festival awards 
2 wins out of 2 nominations

Locarno International Film Festival awards 
1 win out of 2 nominations

Method Fest awards 
0 wins out of 1 nomination

Moscow International Film Festival awards 
1 win out of 1 nomination

San Sebastian International Film Festival awards 
1 win out of 1 nomination

Santa Barbara International Film Festival awards 
1 win out of 1 nomination

ShoWest Convention awards 
1 win out of 1 nomination

Sitges - Catalonian International Film Festival awards 
0 wins out of 1 nomination

USA Film Festival awards 
1 win out of 1 nomination

Virginia Film Festival awards 
1 win out of 1 nomination

International awards

BAFTA/LA Britannia awards 
1 win out of 1 nominations

David di Donatello awards 
1 win out of 2 nominations

European Film Awards 
1 win out of 1 nomination

Evening Standard British Film awards 
1 win out of 1 nomination

Jupiter awards 
0 wins out of 1 nomination

New Zealand Screen awards 
1 win out of 1 nomination

Sant Jordi awards 
1 win out of 1 nomination

Yoga awards 
1 win out of 1 nomination

Miscellaneous awards

20/20 awards 
1 win out of 3 nominations

AARP Movies for Grownups awards 
1 win out of 4 nominations

Fangoria Chainsaw awards 
3 wins out of 4 nominations

Golden Raspberry awards 
0 wins out of 2 nominations

Hasty Pudding Theatricals awards 
1 win out of 1 nomination

MovieGuide awards 
0 wins out of 1 nomination

Satellite awards 
0 wins out of 1 nomination

Saturn awards 
1 win out of 5 nominations

Walk of Fame 
1 win out of 1 nomination

Western Heritage awards 
1 win out of 1 nomination

References

Hopkins, Anthony